Liberation Day is a public holiday in the Netherlands to mark the end of the German occupation of the country during the Second World War. It follows the Remembrance of the Dead (Dodenherdenking) on 4 May.

The Netherlands were liberated by Canadian forces, British infantry divisions, the British I Corps, the 1st Polish Armoured Division, American, Belgian, Dutch and Czechoslovak troops. Parts of the country, in particular the south-east, were liberated by the British Second Army which included American and Polish airborne forces (see Operation Market Garden) and French airbornes (see Operation Amherst). On 5 May 1945, at Hotel de Wereld in Wageningen, I Canadian Corps commander Lieutenant-General Charles Foulkes and Oberbefehlshaber Niederlande commander-in-chief Generaloberst Johannes Blaskowitz reached an agreement on the capitulation of all German forces in the Netherlands. The capitulation document was signed the next day (no typewriter had been available the prior day) in the auditorium of Wageningen University, located next door.

After liberation in 1945, Liberation Day was celebrated every five years. In 1990 the day was declared a national holiday when liberation would be remembered and celebrated every year. Festivals are held in most places in the Netherlands with parades of veterans and musical festivals throughout the whole country.

See also
 Battle of the Netherlands
 Liberation of the Netherlands
 Liberation Day
 Liberation of Arnhem
 Victory in Europe Day

References

External links
 Nationaal Comité 4 en 5 mei
WWII: Liberation of the Netherlands - Canada at War
1st Polish armoured division liberating Netherlands
4th Canadian armoured division liberating Netherlands

 

Public holidays in the Netherlands
May observances
National days
Wageningen
History of Wageningen
L
Annual events in the Netherlands
Spring (season) events in the Netherlands